The Ain-i-Akbari or the "Administration of Akbar", is a 16th-century detailed document recording the administration of the Mughal Empire under Emperor Akbar, written by his court historian, Abu'l Fazl in the Persian language. It forms Volume III and the final part of the much larger document, the Akbarnama (Account of Akbar), also by Abu'l-Fazl, and is itself in three volumes.

Contents
The Ain-i-Akbari is the third volume of the Akbarnama containing information on Akbar's reign in the form of administrative reports, similar to a gazetteer. In Blochmann's explanation, "it contains the 'āīn' (i.e. mode of governing) of Emperor Akbar, and is in fact the administrative report and statistical return of his government as it was about 1590."

The Ain-i-Akbari is divided into five books. The first book called manzil-abadi deals with the imperial household and its maintenance, and the second called sipah-abadi, with the servants of the emperor, military and civil services. The third deals with imperial administration, containing regulations for the judiciary and the executive. The fourth contains information on Hindu philosophy, science, social customs and literature. The fifth contains sayings of Akbar, along with an account of the ancestry and biography of the author.

Volumes
Volume 1: Manzil-abadi (meaning place establishment)

The volume has a total of 90 'Ain' or Regulations dealing and describing the different segments of administration and occupations at that time. The various ains include the one on the imperial mint, its workmen and their process of refining and extracting gold and silver, the dirham and the dinar etc. There are also portions dedicated to the Imperial Harem (Ain 15), the royal seals (Ain 20), the imperial kitchen (Ain 23) and its recipes and the rules relating to the days of abstinence (Ain 26). The volume contains a detailed description of the trade/business of items such as fruits, vegetables, perfumes, carpets etc. and also of art and painting. Ain-i-Akbari is an excellent resource of information on the maintenance of the Mughal army during Akbar's reign. Ain 35 onwards deals with the use and maintenance of artillery, upkeep and branding of royal horses, camels, mules and elephants, describing even the detail of the food given to animals. The volume also has regulations pertaining to the wages of labourers, estimates of house building etc.

Volume 2: Sipah-abadi (meaning military establishment)

The second book treats of the servants of the throne, the military and civil services, and the attendants at court whose literary genius or musical skill received a great deal of encouragement from the emperor, and who similarly commend the high value of their work.

Volume 3: Mulk-abadi (meaning government of a country or government establishment)

The third book is entirely devoted to regulations for the judicial and executive departments, the establishment of a new and more practical era, the survey of the land, the tribal divisions, and the rent-roll of the finance minister.

Volume 4 (law and social conditions)

The fourth book treats of the social condition and literary activity, especially in philosophy and law, of the Hindus, who form the bulk of the population, and in whose political advancement the emperor saw the guarantee of the stability of his realm. There are also a few chapters on the foreign invaders of India, on distinguished travellers, and on Muslim saints and the sects to which they belong.

Volume 5 (things spoken and done by emperor Akbar)

The fifth book contains moral sentences and epigrammatical sayings, observations, and rules of wisdom of the emperor collected by Abu'l Fazl.

Ain-i-Akbari by  Syed Ahmad Khan 
In 1855, Sir Syed Ahmad Khan finished his scholarly, well researched and illustrated edition of Abul Fazl's Ai'n-e Akbari, itself an extraordinarily difficult book. Having finished the work to his satisfaction, the work was brought to Mirza Asadullah Khan Ghalib believing that  he would appreciate his labours. He approached the great Ghalib to write a taqriz (in the convention of the times, a laudatory foreword) for it. Ghalib obliged, but what he did produce was a short Persian poem castigating the Ai'n-e Akbari, and by implication, the imperial, sumptuous, literate and learned Mughal culture of which it was a product. The least that could be said against it was that the book had little value even as an antique document. Ghalib practically reprimanded Syed Ahmad Khan for wasting his talents and time on dead things. He also lavished praise the "sahibs of England" who at that time held all the keys to all the a’ins in this world.

The poem was unexpected, but it came at the time when Syed Ahmad Khan's thought and feelings themselves were inclining toward change. Ghalib seemed to be acutely aware of changes in world polity due to the actions of the great powers, especially Indian polity. Syed Ahmad might well have been piqued at Ghalib's admonitions, but he would also have realized that Ghalib's reading of the situation, though not nuanced enough, was basically accurate. Syed Ahmad Khan may also have felt that he, being better informed about the British and the outside world, should have himself seen the change that now seemed to be just round the corner.

Sir Syed Ahmad Khan never again wrote a word in praise of the Ai'n-e Akbari and in fact gave up taking an active interest in history and archaeology. He did edit another two historical texts over the next few years, but neither of them was anything like the Ai'n: a vast and triumphalist document on the governance of Akbar.

Notable Ains
The Mustard of Man (Ain 76 Book 1)
The business which Akbar Majesty transacts is multifarious. A large number of men were appointed on the days assembly of expenditure was announced. Their merits are inquired into and the coin of knowledge passes the current. Some pray his majesty to remove religious doubt; other again seek his advice for settling a worldly matter; other want medicines for their cure. Like these many other requests were made.
The salaries of large number of men from Iran, Turkey, Europe, Hindustan and Kashmir are fixed in a manner described below, and the men themselves are taken before His Majesty by the paymasters. Formerly it had been custom for man to come with horses and accoutrements; but now only men appointed to the post of Ahadi were  allowed  to bring horses. The salary is proposed by the officer who bring them, which is then increased or decreased, though it is generally increased; for the market of His Majesty is never dull. The number of men brought before His Majesty depends on number of men available. Every Monday all such horsemen are mustered  as were left from the preceding week. With the view of increasing army and zeal of officers, His Majesty gives to each who brings horsemen, a present of two dams for each horsemen.

Regulation regarding education (Ain 25 Book 2)
His Majesty orders that every school boy must learn to write the letters of the alphabet first and then learn to trace their several forms. he ought to learn the shape and name of each letter, which may be done on two days, after which the boy should proceed to write joined letter. They may be practiced for a week after which boy should learn some prose and poetry by heart, and then commit to memory some verses to the praise of God, or moral sentences, each written separately. Care is to be taken that he learns everything by himself but the teacher must assist him a little.

Translations
Ain-i-Akbari was one of the first Persian texts to be translated into the English language. The original Persian text was translated into English in three volumes. The first volume, translated by Heinrich Blochmann (1873) consisted of Books I and II.  The second volume, translated by Col. Henry Sullivan Jarrett (1891), contained Book III, and the remaining volume, also translated by Jarrett (1896), Books IV and V. These three volumes were published by the Asiatic Society of  Calcutta as a part of their Bibliotheca Indica series.

See also 
 Mughal Karkhanas
 Mughal Empire
 Qutni

References

External links
 Ayeen Akbery (1684)
 The Ain i Akbari, Volume 3 (1894)
 Supplement to the first volume of Gladwin's Ayeen Akberi (1918)
 Ayeen Akbery, Or, The Institutes of the Emperor Akber, Volume 1
 Ain-e-Akbari, English translation, by H. Blochmann and Colonel H. S. Jarrett, 1873 – 1907. The Asiatic Society of Bengal, Calcutta. at Packard Humanities Institute
 Ain-e-Akbari, English tr. by Colonel H. S. Jarrett. The Asiatic Society of Bengal, Calcutta. 1948 
 Aeene Akbari Part I at Digital Library of India 
Persian text of the A'in-i Akbari in three parts:
 https://archive.org/details/AbuAl-fazlsAin-iAkbariInPersianVol1Part1of2
 https://archive.org/details/AbuAl-fazlsAin-iAkbariInPersianVol1Part2of2
 https://archive.org/details/Ain-iAkbariOfAbuAl-fazlVolume2Ahval-iHindustan

Mughal literature
Books about the Mughal Empire
16th-century Indian books
16th-century illuminated manuscripts
Indian manuscripts
Islamic illuminated manuscripts
Mughal art
Akbar
Works by Syed Ahmed Khan
Indian chronicles